Savanur State, Nawab of Savanur was one of the princely states in British India. The last ruler of the state acceded to the Dominion of India on 8 March 1948, becoming part of the Mysore State in what is now Karnataka.

History

The name Savanur is said to be the corruption of the Persian word Shahnoor, which means 'king of light'. Few others claim that the city was established in the Hindu month of Shravan, and hence the name Savanur. After the collapse of the Maratha Empire in 1818, following the Third Anglo-Maratha War, Savanur accepted protection from British East India Company and became a British protectorate.

The Nawabs of Savanur were tolerant of all religions, and donated liberally to several Hindu temples and mutts. Betel leaves, jowar and cotton were the principal exports of the Savanur state. The Nawabs also had cordial relationship with the Dvaita mutt associated with Sri Satyabodhatirtha.

See also
 List of Sunni Muslim dynasties
 Pashtun diaspora
 Political integration of India

References

External links

Muslim princely states of India
History of Karnataka
Pashtun dynasties